Compagnie des chemins de fer de Grande Banlieue or CGB, was a railway company in the western suburban region of Paris, France, in the former département of Seine-et-Oise.

Despite efforts by the company, many of its lines never became profitable. It is the mass use of the automobile that gave the final blow to the CGB, buses took the passengers away from the lines onto irregular and non-direct bus lines. The tramway to Les Halles in Paris closed but the rails remained, plans were to run the trains from Pontoise via Poissy to Paris but residents  close to Place de l'Étoile were against it, complaining about the noise of trains at night. Trains ran until 1933.

Le tacot Pontoise-Poissy

In 1912 was built a  railway line from Pontoise to Poissy. This line linked all the towns and villages along the River Oise to Andrésy and Poissy. The Chemins de fer du Département de Seine-et-Oise wished to link the lines from Paris with a circular line following the river, for technical and economic reasons, the line was built following the meandering river to prevent the building of tunnels and large viaducts. The line was always regarded as a tramway as some portions of the line ran on roads. The journey from Pontoise to Poissy took 1 hour and 20 minutes.

Passenger traffic was never the line's forte so the company tried to generate freight traffic to Paris. Vegetable farmers (maraîchers) transported their stock to Les Halles in Paris by connecting services.

Car and lorry transported killed the non-profitable line and it closed during 1929.

Line openings

Network
Most of the CGB's lines connected with main lines owned by Chemins de Fer de l'Ouest, linking important towns through valleys.

External links
 FACS UNECTO

Railway companies of France